Delphinella deviata is a species of fungus in the family Dothioraceae.

References

External links

Fungi described in 1962
Dothideales